Zyganisus is a genus of moths in the family Cossidae.

Species
 Zyganisus cadigalorum Kallies & D.J. Hilton, 2012
 Zyganisus caliginosus (Walker, 1856)
 Zyganisus fulvicollis (Gaede, 1933)
 Zyganisus propedia Kallies & D.J. Hilton, 2012
 Zyganisus acalanthis Kallies & D.J. Hilton, 2012

References

  & , 2012: Revision of Cossinae and small Zeuzerinae from Australia (Lepidoptera: Cossidae). Zootaxa 3454: 1-62. Abstract: .

External links
Natural History Museum Lepidoptera generic names catalog

Cossinae